The Ralph J. Bunche International Affairs Center is a research, educational and professional development center for international affairs at Howard University in Washington, D.C. The center was founded in 1993 to serve as a resource center for students interested in pursuing careers in foreign affairs and to process subject-related inquiries from outside entities like government agencies, NGOs, corporations, other universities and foreign embassies.

The center is currently headed by former U.S. Ambassador to Botswana, Horace G. Dawson, Jr., and is an affiliate member of the Association of Professional Schools of International Affairs.

Founding

The center is named for Ralph Bunche, a former Howard professor who became the first person of color to win the Nobel Peace Prize.  In 1963, he was the recipient of the Presidential Medal of Freedom.

Howard University established the Bunche Center in 1993 with a grant from the W.K. Kellogg Foundation. It currently coordinates study abroad programs for Howard students, sponsors "Diplomats in Residence" and aims to place Howard students in US embassies worldwide.

Programs and Initiatives

The Rangel Program is a collaborative effort between Howard University and the U.S. Department of State that seeks to attract and prepare outstanding young people for careers as diplomats in the U.S. Foreign Service. The program seeks individuals interested in helping to shape a freer, more secure and prosperous world through formulating, representing, and implementing U.S. foreign policy. The Program encourages the application of members of minority groups historically underrepresented in the Foreign Service and those with financial need.

There are two major components to the Rangel Program: the Charles B. Rangel International Affairs Fellowship, which provides support for graduate school, professional development, and entry into the U.S. Foreign Service, and an undergraduate International Affairs Summer Enrichment Program that provides undergraduates with the opportunity to enhance their skills, knowledge and understanding about U.S. foreign policy.

References

External links
 Howard University
 APSIA - Howard University's Ralph J. Bunche International Affairs Center

Howard University
1993 establishments in Washington, D.C.